Oberea yasuhikoi is a species of beetle in the family Cerambycidae. It was described by Kusakabe in 2001.

References

Beetles described in 2001
yasuhikoi